Gegenes pumilio, the pigmy skipper or dark Hottentot, is a butterfly of the family Hesperiidae. It is found from the coasts of the Mediterranean Sea through Anatolia  to the Himalaya and south in the whole of Africa.

The length of the forewings is about 14 mm. Adults are on wing from April to October in multiple generations.

The larvae feed on various grasses, including Gramineae species as well as Pennisetum clandestinum, Ehrharta (including Ehrharta erecta) and Cynodon species.

Subspecies
Gegenes pumilio pumilio (southern Europe, Middle East, India, United Arab Emirates, Saudi Arabia, Yemen, Oman)
Gegenes pumilio gambica (Mabille, 1878) (Africa, Arabia to Lebanon, Turkey to northern Pakistan, Kashmir)
Gegenes pumilio monochroa (Rebel, 1907) (Yemen: Socotra)

References

External links
All butterflies of Europe
Lepiforum
Moths and Butterflies of Europe and North Africa

Fauna of Pakistan
Butterflies described in 1804
Hesperiinae
Butterflies of Europe
Taxa named by Johann Centurius Hoffmannsegg